Megaustenia is a genus of air-breathing land snails, terrestrial pulmonate gastropod mollusks in the subfamily Ariophantinae of the family Ariophantidae.

Species
 Megaustenia annhiae (Thach & F. Huber, 2017)
 Megaustenia balansai (Mabille, 1889)
 Megaustenia birmanica (Philippi, 1847)
 Megaustenia cochinchinensis (Morelet, 1866)
 Megaustenia fragilis (Möllendorff, 1901)
 Megaustenia heliciformis (L. Pfeiffer, 1855)
 Megaustenia huberi (Thach, 2016)
 Megaustenia imperator (A. Gould, 1859)
 Megaustenia inusitata (Godwin-Austen, 1898)
 Megaustenia khyoungensis (Godwin-Austen, 1888)
 Megaustenia malefica (J. Mabille, 1887)
 Megaustenia messageri (Bavay & Dautzenberg, 1909)
 Megaustenia praestans (Gould, 1843)
 Megaustenia rondonyi (H. Fischer, 1898)
 Megaustenia siamensis (Haines, 1855)
 Megaustenia tongkingensis (Möllendorff, 1901)
 Megaustenia unguiculus (Morelet, 1865)
Species brought into synonymy
 Megaustenia russeola (Morelet, 1865): synonym of Durgella russeola (Morelet, 1865) (unaccepted combination)
 Megaustenia siamense (Haines, 1855): synonym of Megaustenia siamensis (Haines, 1855) (incorrect gender of species name)
 Megaustenia tecta (Souleyet, 1852): synonym of Macrochlamys tecta (Souleyet, 1852)

References

 Theobald, W. (1857). Notes on the distribution of some of the land and freshwater shells of India: Part I. The Journal of the Asiatic Society of Bengal, 26 (4): 245–254. Calcutta.
 Solem, A. (1966). Some non-marine mollusks from Thailand, with notes on classification of the Helicarionidae. Spolia Zoologica Musei Hauniensis, 24: 1–110, 3 plates.
  Bank, R. A. (2017). Classification of the Recent terrestrial Gastropoda of the World. Last update: July 16, 2017

External links

 Cockerell, T. D. A. (1912). The genera Cryptogirasia and Cryptosoma. The Nautilus. 26(9): 70.

Ariophantidae